Piet Pieterszoon Hein (25 November 1577 – 18 June 1629) was a Dutch admiral and privateer for the Dutch Republic during the Eighty Years' War. Hein was the first and the last to capture a large part of a Spanish treasure fleet which transported huge amounts of gold and silver from Spanish America to Spain. The amount of silver taken was so big that it resulted in the rise of the price of silver worldwide and the near bankruptcy of Spain.

Early life 
Hein was born in Delfshaven (now part of Rotterdam), the son of a sea captain, and he became a sailor while he was still a teenager. During his first journeys he suffered from extreme motion sickness. In his twenties, he was captured by the Spanish, and served as a galley slave for about four years, probably between 1598 and 1602, when he was traded for Spanish prisoners. Between 1603 and 1607, he was again held captive by the Spanish, when captured near Cuba.

Naval career

Dutch East India Company 
In 1607, he joined the Dutch East India Company and left for Asia, returning with the rank of captain (of the Hollandia) five years later. He married Anneke Claesdochter de Reus and settled in Rotterdam. In 1618, when he was captain of the Neptunus, both he and his ship were pressed into service by the Republic of Venice. In 1621, he left his vessel behind and traveled overland to the Netherlands.

For a year in 1622, he was a member of the local government of Rotterdam, although he did not have citizenship of this city: the cousin of his wife, one of the three burgomasters, made this possible.

Dutch West India Company 
After capital had been raised for the Dutch West India Company, the company's directors, the Heeren XIX, devised the Groot Desseyn in October 1623. The plan was to first seize the capital of Brazil, São Salvador da Bahia (Salvador), and then the main Portuguese fort on the coast of Angola, São Paulo de Loanda (Luanda). In this way, the company would control both the lucrative sugar plantations in Brazil and the Atlantic slave trade. Control of the trade itself was necessary because of the high mortality rate from the plantations' harsh conditions and tropical diseases such as malaria.

In the same year Piet Hein became vice-admiral of the new Dutch West India Company, and sailed to the West Indies the following year. In Colonial Brazil, he briefly captured the Portuguese settlement of Salvador, personally leading the assault on the sea fortress of that town. In August with a small and undermanned fleet he sailed for the African west coast and attacked a Portuguese fleet in the strongly defended bay of Luanda but failed to capture any ships.

Privateering activity 
He then crossed the Atlantic Ocean again to try and capture merchant ships at the city of Vitória, but was defeated by a resistance organized by the local citizenry with the assistance of the Portuguese garrison. After finding that Salvador had been recaptured by a large Spanish–Portuguese fleet, Hein returned home. The Dutch West India Company, pleased with Hein's leadership qualities, placed him in command of a new squadron in 1626. In subsequent raids during 1627 at Salvador, he attacked and captured over thirty richly laden Portuguese merchant ships before returning to the Dutch Republic.

Spanish treasure fleet 

In 1628, during the eighty year's Dutch liberation war from Spain, Admiral Hein, with Witte de With as his flag captain, sailed out to capture a Spanish treasure fleet loaded with silver from the Spanish American colonies and the Philippines. With him was Admiral Hendrick Lonck and he was later joined by a squadron of Vice-Admiral Joost Banckert, as well as by the pirate Moses Cohen Henriques. Part of the Spanish fleet in Venezuela had been warned because a Dutch cabin boy had lost his way on Blanquilla island and was captured and betrayed the plan, but the other half from Mexico continued its voyage, unaware of the threat. Sixteen Spanish ships were intercepted and captured: one galleon was taken after a surprise encounter during the night, nine smaller merchants were talked into a surrender; two fleeing small ships were taken at sea, and four fleeing galleons were trapped on the Cuban coast in the Bay of Matanzas.

After some musket volleys from Dutch sloops, the crews of the galleons also surrendered and Hein captured 11,509,524 guilders of booty in gold, silver, and other expensive trade goods, such as indigo and cochineal, without any bloodshed. The Dutch did not take prisoners: they gave the Spanish crews ample supplies for a march to Havana. The released were surprised to hear the admiral personally giving them directions in fluent Spanish; Hein after all was well acquainted with the region as he had been confined to it during his internment after 1603.

The capture of the treasure fleet was the Dutch West India Company's greatest victory in the Caribbean. It enabled the Dutch, at war with Spain, to fund their army for eight months (and as a direct consequence, allowing it to capture the fortress 's-Hertogenbosch), and the shareholders enjoyed a cash dividend of 50% for that year. The financial loss strategically weakened their Spanish enemy. Hein returned to the Netherlands in 1629, where he was hailed as a hero. Watching the crowds cheering him as he stood on the balcony of the town hall of Leyden, he remarked to the burgomaster: "Now they praise me because I gained riches without the least danger; but earlier when I risked my life in full combat they didn't even know I existed...". Hein was the first and the last to capture such a large part of a Spanish "silver fleet" from Spain.

Lieutenant-Admiral 
He became, after a conflict with the Dutch West India Company about policy and payment, Lieutenant-Admiral of Holland and West Frisia on 26 March 1629, and thus factual supreme commander of the confederate Dutch fleet, taking as flag captain Maarten Tromp.

He died the same year, in a campaign against the Dunkirkers, the highly effective fleet of Habsburg commerce raiders and privateers operating from Dunkirk. As it happened, his flotilla intercepted three privateers from Ostend. He deliberately moved his flagship in between two enemy ships to give them both simultaneous broadsides. After half an hour, he was hit in the left shoulder by a cannonball and was killed instantly. He is buried in the Oude Kerk in Delft.

Commemoration 
The Piet Hein Tunnel in Amsterdam is named in his honor, as is the former Dutch , HNLMS Piet Heyn. A direct descendant of Hein was Piet Hein, a famous 20th century Danish mathematician, physicist and poet. A song praising Admiral Hein's capture of the Spanish "silver fleet" written in 1844 is still sung by choirs and children at primary school in the Netherlands, as well as during traditional drinks by student unions in Belgian universities. A statue of him stands in his native Delfshaven, now a district in Rotterdam, and one in the Cuban city of Matanzas near where the silver fleet battle occurred.

Rejection of slavery 
Piet Hein rejected the slavery in the Spanish New World colonies, as the inhumane treatment of fellow human beings. Dutch historian Siebe Thissen suggests that he rejected slavery after his 10 years capture by the Spanish empire. During this capture Hein served as a galley slave. It is unclear how this rejection of slavery fits in his activities for the Dutch West India Company, and his contributions to their Groot Desseyn.

There is an ongoing debate on the meaning of slavery within Dutch history, in which Piet Hein is an anachronistic figure head. On the one hand, some modern critiques attribute the evils of the Dutch Atlantic slave trade to him. On the other hand, he is still used as a hero figure, within a 19th-century expression of romantic idealism. In June 2020 his statue in Delfshaven was defaced.

References

Footnotes

Bibliography

External links 
 
 
 
 

16th-century Dutch people
17th-century Dutch military personnel
1577 births
1629 deaths
Admirals of the navy of the Dutch Republic
Burials at the Oude Kerk, Delft
Dutch military personnel killed in action
Dutch people of the Eighty Years' War (United Provinces)
Naval commanders of the Eighty Years' War
Military personnel from Rotterdam
People of the Dutch–Portuguese War
Dutch privateers
Sailors on ships of the Dutch West India Company
Galley slaves
Spanish slaves